The British Rail Class 333 are electric multiple unit passenger trains built by CAF between 2000 and 2003 for Northern Spirit (later Arriva Trains Northern), with traction equipment supplied by Siemens Transportation Systems. All have passed to subsequent franchises and subsequent operators Northern Rail, Arriva Rail North and Northern Trains.

History
In March 1998, Angel Trains ordered 16 three-carriage sets from Siemens Transportation Systems for Northern Spirit to replace the slam-door Class 308s on the Airedale and Wharfedale lines from Leeds to Bradford Forster Square, Ilkley and Skipton. Construction of the trains was sub-contracted to CAF with Siemens Transportation Systems providing the traction equipment.

The first was delivered to Neville Hill TMD in March 2000. The first entered service on 12 January 2001.

In April 2000, a further eight trailer carriages were ordered with funding from West Yorkshire Passenger Transport Executive and inserted into the first eight sets in 2002. Subsequently a further order was placed with funding from the Strategic Rail Authority to increase the remaining sets to four carriages. These were delivered in 2003.

However, the funding for the fourth carriages in the latter eight sets expired in 2007 and as a consequence of this they could have been removed. Had this happened the four-car Class 321s would have been removed from Leeds to Doncaster services. As a result, the fourth cars were funded by the South Yorkshire Passenger Transport Executive, despite not running in South Yorkshire, to ensure that four-car units are available on Doncaster services.

In 2008, all were repainted into a new livery by Wabtec at Doncaster Works that incorporated West Yorkshire Metro branding.

When Arriva Rail North was awarded the Northern franchise in December 2015 plans were announced for the replacement of Class 333 units with a new fleet of 3-car trains, though ultimately this did not occur.

Between December 2018 and April 2020, all were refurbished by Chrysalis Rail, Holbeck and repainted into Arriva Rail North and later Northern Trains livery.

In 2022 the 333s started receiving digital upgrades, these upgrades include added USB power plugs and Digital display screens among other upgrades.

Performance
They have standard class only 2+3 high-density seating, and each set has one toilet.

Fleet details

Named units
Some units have previously carried names:
333007 Alderman J Arthur Godwin, First Lord Mayor of Bradford 1907 (Unit denamed)
333011 Olicana, Ilkley’s Roman Fort (Unit denamed)

Gallery

See also
British Rail Class 332, similar units operated by Heathrow Express until 28 December 2020

References

External links

333
CAF multiple units
Train-related introductions in 2001
25 kV AC multiple units